Evair Aparecido Paulino (born 21 February 1965), simply known as Evair, is a retired Brazilian footballer. Evair played for several clubs throughout his career; he is most famous for his time with Palmeiras, where he recorded 125 goals, making him the seventh all-time top scorer for the club. He also made a significant contribution to Vasco da Gama, helping the club win the Brazilian Série A title in 1997.

Career statistics

Club

International

Honours
Palmeiras
Brasileirão Série A: 1993, 1994, 1997
Campeonato Paulista: 1993, 1994
 Rio-São Paulo Tournament: 1993
 Copa Libertadores: 1999

Individual
Campeonato Paulista Top Scorer: 1988, 1994

References

External links

1965 births
Living people
Association football forwards
Brazilian footballers
Brazilian expatriate footballers
Expatriate footballers in Italy
Expatriate footballers in Japan
Campeonato Brasileiro Série A players
Serie A players
J1 League players
Brazil international footballers
Brazilian football managers
Guarani FC players
Atalanta B.C. players
Sociedade Esportiva Palmeiras players
Yokohama Flügels players
Clube Atlético Mineiro players
CR Vasco da Gama players
Associação Portuguesa de Desportos players
São Paulo FC players
Goiás Esporte Clube players
Coritiba Foot Ball Club players
Figueirense FC players
Vila Nova Futebol Clube managers
Anápolis Futebol Clube managers
Clube Recreativo e Atlético Catalano managers
Itumbiara Esporte Clube managers
Uberlândia Esporte Clube managers
Ríver Atlético Clube managers
Pan American Games gold medalists for Brazil
Pan American Games medalists in football
People from Ouro Fino
Footballers at the 1987 Pan American Games
Medalists at the 1987 Pan American Games
Sportspeople from Minas Gerais